Self-hosting may refer to:
 Self-hosting (compilers), a computer program that produces new versions of that same program
 Self-hosting (web services), the practice of running and maintaining a website using a private web server

See also
 Self-booting disk